Public notice is a notice given to the public regarding certain types of legal proceedings.


By government
Public notices are issued by a government agency or legislative body in certain rulemaking or lawmaking proceeding.  

It is a requirement in most jurisdictions, in order to allow members of the public to make their opinions on proposals known before a rule or law is made.

For local government, public notice is often given by those seeking a liquor license, a rezoning or variance, or other minor approval which must be granted by a city council, county commission, or board of supervisors.

By private individuals or companies
Parties to some legal proceedings, such as foreclosures, probate, and estate actions are sometimes required to publish public notices.

In communications
Public notices are sometimes required to seek a new broadcast license from a national broadcasting authority, or a change to modification to an existing license.

U.S. broadcast stations are required to give public notice on the air that they are seeking a license renewal from the U.S. Federal Communications Commission (FCC) or to notify viewers of the station's purchase by another party. Records of the public notices must often be kept in a station's public file.

Method of notice
One method of notice is publication of a public notice ad in a local newspaper of record.  Public notice can also be given in other ways, including radio, television, and on the Internet. Some governments required publication in a local/nationwide newspaper or the government gazette, though there have been attempts among some politicians to eliminate the expense of publication by switching to electronic forms of notification.

See also
Constructive notice
Substituted service
UCC-1 financing statement

Notes

References
 The Public Notice Resource Center 

Broadcast law
Administrative law